Paul Edwin Roth (1918–1985) was a German stage, television and film actor. Roth made his screen debut in the rubble film And the Heavens Above Us (1947). He was a regular in West Germany films and television during the post-war years. He was also a notable voice actor, dubbing a number of international stars (particularly American and British) for the German market.

Selected filmography
 And the Heavens Above Us (1947) - Werner Richter
 Our Daily Bread (1949) - Harry Webers
 Ingrid – Die Geschichte eines Fotomodells (1955)
 Children, Mother, and the General (1955)
 Confess, Doctor Corda (1958) - Dr. Schimmer
 For Love and Others (1959) - Otto Lürmann
  (1960) - Sachverständiger
  (1960) - Oberfeldrichter Wirrmann
 The Miracle of Father Malachia (1961) - Secretary of the Bishop
 The Longest Day (1962) - Col. Schiller (uncredited)
 Irrungen - Wirrungen (1966) - Sprecher
 4 Schlüssel (1966) - Konrad von Brenken
  (1966, TV miniseries) - Peter Masterson
 Sherlock Holmes - Dr. Watson
 The Bordello (1971) - Herr Silberstein
 Und Jimmy ging zum Regenbogen (1971) - Dr. Karl Friedjung
 Zoff (1972)
 The Stuff That Dreams Are Made Of (1972) - Oswald Seerose
 Die Hinrichtung (1976)
 Drei Bürger zum Geburtstag (1979)
 Drei Schwedinnen auf der Reeperbahn (1980) - Jens-Uwe
 Seitenstechen (1985) - Norbert's father
 Zirkuskinder (1985) - Pfarrer Erhardt (final film role)

References

Bibliography 
 Shandley, Robert R. Rubble Films: German Cinema in the Shadow of the Third Reich. Temple University Press, 2001.

External links 
 

1918 births
1985 deaths
German male television actors
German male stage actors
German male film actors
Male actors from Hamburg
20th-century German male actors